Ryan Seaton may refer to:

 Ryan Seaton (singer) (born 1979), gospel singer 
 Ryan Seaton (sailor), Northern Ireland-born sailor who competed at the 2012 Olympics
 Ryan Seaton, member of the band Callers